Dreaming a Dream is a 1975 single by New York-based group, Crown Heights Affair. The single went to number-one on the Disco File Top 20 chart for one week, and was the most successful of five releases.  "Dreaming a Dream" also made it to number five on the Billboard soul chart and number forty-three on the Hot 100.

References

1975 singles
Disco songs
1975 songs